Foad or FOAD may refer to:

Slang 

 F.O.A.D Is Internet slang and an Initialism for "Fuck Off and Die"

Music
 F.O.A.D., a 2007 album by Darkthrone

People
 Foad Manshadi (born 1987), American musician and activist
 Foad Rafii (born 1947), Canadian architect
 Foad Mostafa Soltani (1948–1979), Kurdish revolutionary

See also
 Fuad (name)